The Politics of Taiyuan in Shanxi province in the People's Republic of China is structured in a dual party-government system like all other governing institutions in mainland China.

The Mayor of Taiyuan is the highest-ranking official in the People's Government of Taiyuan or Taiyuan Municipal Government. However, in the city's dual party-government governing system, the Mayor has less power than the Communist Party of Taiyuan Municipal Committee Secretary, colloquially termed the "CPC Party Chief of Taiyuan" or "Communist Party Secretary of Taiyuan".

History
On April 12, 2014, Shen Weichen was being investigated by the Central Commission for Discipline Inspection of the Communist Party of China (CCDI) for "serious violations of laws and regulations".

On August 23, 2014, Chen Chuanping was being investigated by the Central Commission for Discipline Inspection of the Communist Party of China for "serious violations of laws and regulations".

List of mayors of Taiyuan

List of CPC Party secretaries of Taiyuan

References

Taiyuan
Taiyuan